Michael Gerard Woost (born September 17, 1958) is an American bishop of the Catholic Church who serves as auxiliary bishop for the Diocese of Cleveland in Ohio.

Biography
Michael Woost was born on September 27, 1958, in Cleveland, Ohio. On June 9, 1984, Woost was ordained to the priesthood by Bishop Anthony Pilla for the Diocese of Cleveland. 

Pope Francis appointed Woost as an auxiliary bishop for the Diocese of Cleveland on May 9, 2022.  On August 4, 2022, Woost was consecrated as a bishop by Bishop Edward C. Malesic.

See also

 Catholic Church hierarchy
 Catholic Church in the United States
 Historical list of the Catholic bishops of the United States
 List of Catholic bishops of the United States
 Lists of patriarchs, archbishops, and bishops

References

External links
Roman Catholic Diocese of Cleveland Official Site

Episcopal succession

 

1958 births
Living people
American Roman Catholic priests
Bishops appointed by Pope Francis